Phillip is a closed railway platform on the Richmond railway line in New South Wales, Australia. The platform opened in 1928 and closed on 26 July 1952.

References

Disused railway stations in Sydney
Railway stations in Australia opened in 1928
Railway stations closed in 1952